Qaleh-ye Bala (also Romanized as Qal‘eh-ye Bālā; also known as Dārestān-e Bālā, Qal‘eh-ey Bālā ī, and Qal‘eh-ye Bālā’ī) is a village in Kork and Nartich Rural District, in the Central District of Bam County, Kerman Province, Iran. At the 2006 census, its population was 27, in 6 families.

References 

Populated places in Bam County